The Rochor River is a canalised river in Kallang of the Central Region in Singapore. The river is about 0.8 km in length.

The Rochor River is a continuation of the Rochor Canal, and begins beneath Victoria Bridge and empties into the Kallang Basin.  The Rochor Canal continues upstream as far as the junction of Jalan Jurong Kechil and Upper Bukit Timah Road; the source of the Rochor River lies in Beauty World MRT station, which has a possible extension to Tengah as part of the Deep Tunnel Sewerage System, it also has a canal that leads to the Kranji Reservoir. "Rochor Canal" is also the name of a subzone within the planning area of Rochor.

The river has often been regulated in the past and expanded by channels to control the floods in Bukit Timah. While the lower course is undoubtedly called the Rochor River, the Victoria Bridge upstream alternatively uses the name Rochor Canal or – even more upstream – Bukit Timah Canal, as can be found on various maps. The canal has been cleaned and renovated frequently. Because this did not help, the Bukit Timah Flood Alleviation Scheme (BTFAS) of the Singapore National Water Agency PUB (built in the 1960s) added two additional service channels: the Bukit Timah First Diversion Canal (1966–1972, 3.2 km after Pandan Reservoir) and the Bukit Timah Second Diversion Canal (1990s, 4.4 km long, to Kallang Basin). They partly run underground in tunnels.

The originated in the 1830s Rochor Canal favored the emergence of cattle trading in Little India. With its water, the pastures were fed, where the buffalo grazed and where the trade was done with them. Today's wet market Tekka Center (also known as Tekka Market) used to be called Kandang Kerbau Market ("KK Market") in 1915, where "kerbau" in Malay means something like "cattle enclosure". In addition to cattle breeding developed in this area, known as Kampong Kerbau ("Buffalo Village", about cattle village in Malay), farms such as slaughterhouses, dairy and similar. In the 1880s oxen and cowsheds as well as pony and horse stables were to be found throughout the district. The cattle breeding reached its peak around 1900.

The river (and canal) used to be an important waterway for the timber industry, with many sawmills and wood factories on its banks. Throughout, tree trunks from Indonesia and Malaysia were transported to them.

In 2011, the Water Authority PUB – Singapore's National Water Agency decided to build a 1.1 km section of the Rochor Canal, which was particularly degenerate. This redevelopment was part of the program "Active, Beautiful, Clean Waters Program" (ABC Water program); the cost was estimated at S $48 million. There should be an attractive stretch of the river with urban boulevard, promenades, pedestrian bridges, terraces, several gardens and a community space. The new section, which replaced the old unhygienic canal management, was officially opened on 8 March 2015.

References

Rivers of Singapore
Kallang